George Momberg (May 13, 1934 – August 24, 1995), better known by the ring name Killer Karl Krupp, was a Dutch-born professional wrestler famous during the 1970s and early 1980s.

Early life

George Momberg was born in the Netherlands and was a child during the Nazi occupation of his home country. Sometime after the war, he emigrated to North America.

Professional wrestling career
He made his debut as a professional wrestler in 1957 as Dutch Momberg and was not particularly memorable. Sometime around 1971, he changed his name to Mad Dog Momberg. In 1972, he finally hit upon the gimmick that would make him a star, the character of the 'evil German,' Killer Karl Krupp.

The German heel gimmick had been around a good twenty years by this time, first popularized by Hans Schmidt and carried further by later stars, such as Fritz von Erich. A late entry into the field, Killer Karl Krupp was among the most wildly over-the-top of them all. With eyes bulging, head shaved and a short black beard framing a leering grin, Krupp was the very image of a wildly cartoonish, yet frightening wrestling villain. He accessorized for the part with monocle, riding crop, heavy black boots and black ring cape, and delivered ranting promos in an affected German accent rife with mangled pronunciations. Utilizing other familiar staples of the German heel gimmick, Krupp goose-stepped to the ring, threw stiff-arm salutes, and used an Iron Claw hold (the 'Eye Claw') as his finishing move. What was unknown to the public at the time was that Momberg hated the Nazis, who had occupied his homeland, and he did the over-the-top gimmick as a way of mocking them, Hogan's Heroes-style.

Despite these theatrics, Krupp was a convincing brawler in the ring. Remembered for often completely demolishing his opponents, he relished inflicting pain on them, with little regard for whether or not he was disqualified in the process of doing so.

On June 10, 1972, Krupp won his first of many assorted titles, defeating Leo Burke for the ESA's IW North American Heavyweight Championship. Early the next year he went to Japan, where he had many of his early successes, co-holding the NWA International Tag Team Championship twice between February and April 1973 (once with Johnny Valentine and once each with fellow 'evil Germans', Fritz von Erich and replacement partner Karl von Steiger). He also reached the final rounds of the 1974 and 1975 New Japan Pro-Wrestling World League Tournaments, both of which he lost to Antonio Inoki. Stateside, Krupp first became a big name in the Texas territory in 1973 before moving on to Portland in 1974 where he feuded with Dutch Savage. He also appeared in CWF Florida in 1975 and then moved on to Dick the Bruiser's WWA in Indiana. There as well as in Detroit, he used the moniker Baron von Krupp.

In 1980, Krupp came to Memphis, where he eventually joined Jimmy Hart's First Family of Wrestling stable and tangled with Jerry Lawler. He returned before long, however, to Atlantic, Canada, where he had a memorable run in Atlantic Grand Prix Wrestling, holding the European Title and feuding with The Great Malumba and Hercules Cortez. In the mid-1980s, near the end of his career, he feuded with Angelo Mosca around southern Ontario.
By the end of March 1983, he began wrestling in the Dallas Texas-based territory for his former All Japan Pro Wrestling tag partner, Fritz Von Erich's World Class Championship Wrestling.

Later life
George Momberg retired to his adopted home in Atlantic Canada in 1988, working for Midland Trucking Company. He died in Moncton, New Brunswick after contracting hepatitis while wrestling in Japan.

Championships and accomplishments
All Japan Pro Wrestling
NWA International Tag Team Championship (Japan version) (2 times) - with Johnny Valentine (1) and Fritz von Erich (1)
Atlantic Grand Prix Wrestling
AGPW European Championship (1 time)
AGPW International Championship (2 times)
AGPW North American Tag Team Championship (1 time) - with Hans Herman
Championship Wrestling from Florida
NWA Southern Heavyweight Championship (Florida version) (2 times)
Continental Wrestling Association
AWA Southern Tag Team Championship (1 time) - with El Mongol
Eastern Sports Association
IW North American Heavyweight Championship (3 times)
NWA Big Time Wrestling
NWA Brass Knuckles Championship (Texas version) (4 times)
NWA Western States Sports
NWA Brass Knuckles Championship (Amarillo version) (1 time)
Pacific Northwest Wrestling
NWA Pacific Northwest Tag Team Championship with Kurt von Steiger
World Championship Wrestling (Australia)
NWA Austra-Asian Tag Team Championship (1 time) - with Butcher Brannigan
World Wrestling Council
WWC North American Heavyweight Championship (1 time)

References

External links
SLAM! Wrestling Bio of Killer Karl Krupp
Russian-language profile of Killer Karl Krupp
 

1934 births
1995 deaths
Canadian expatriate professional wrestlers in the United States
Canadian male professional wrestlers
Dutch emigrants to Canada
Faux German professional wrestlers
Naturalized citizens of Canada
Dutch male professional wrestlers
Stampede Wrestling alumni
Professional wrestlers from Ontario
20th-century professional wrestlers
NWF North American Heavyweight Champions
NWA Southern Heavyweight Champions (Florida version)
WCWA Brass Knuckles Champions
NWA Austra-Asian Tag Team Champions
NWA International Tag Team Champions